Jim Fairlie may refer to:

Jim Fairlie (MSP), member of the Scottish Parliament
Jim Fairlie (politician, born 1940), former Deputy Leader of the Scottish National Party

See also
James Fairlie (disambiguation)